Slow Food is the fifth album by Electric Company, released on April 9, 2001, on Planet Mu Records.

Track listing

Personnel 
Brad Laner – instruments, production

References 

2001 albums
Electric Company (band) albums
Planet Mu albums